Silurolepis platydorsalis  is  an extinct species of Silurian-aged "maxillate" placoderm that has been described from (mostly) articulated remains. Although it has been known for several years, it was finally described by Zhang, et al., in 2010.  The earliest described placoderm is the yunnanolepid antiarch, Shimenolepis, from Llandovery Hunan.  In contrast to S. platydorsalis, Shimenolepis is known only from distinctively ornamented thoracic armor plates that bear anatomic features unique to yunnanolepids.

S. platydorsalis was previously considered a basal antiarch, but a 2019 study instead recovers it as a maxillate placoderm most closely related to Qilinyu.

S. platydorsalis is known from thoracic armor: as the specific name suggests, the dorsal side is very flat.

References

Placoderms of Asia
Silurian fish of Asia
Fossil taxa described in 2010
Placoderm genera